The Jatinga River is a north bank tributary of the Barak River in the Indian state of Assam. The river originates from Barail hill range in the village Jatinga at Dima Hasao district of Assam.

References 

Rivers of Assam
Rivers of India